Ben Moore (born 4 July 1977) is a former Australian rules footballer who played with Richmond in the Australian Football League (AFL).

Moore, a rover and half forward, started playing for Glenelg in 1995. He was selected by Richmond at pick 46 in the 1995 National Draft and made 24 appearances for the club in four seasons. Moore kicked goals with his first two kicks in AFL footbal, despite this being his second game (he did not get a kick on debut) In 2000 he returned to Glenelg, where he remained until 2007, captaining them in 2004 and 2005. He played for Reynella in 2008 and joined Langhorne Creek the following year.

References

External links
 
 

1977 births
Living people
Australian rules footballers from South Australia
Richmond Football Club players
Glenelg Football Club players
Reynella Football Club players